South Carolina Highway 461 (SC 461) is a  state highway in the U.S. state of South Carolina. The highway is completely within the West Ashley portion of Charleston.

Route description
SC 461 begins at an intersection with SC 61 (Ashley River Road) in the West Ashley portion of Charleston, Charleston County. Here it is known as Paul Cantrell Boulevard. It travels to the west and immediately curves to the west-northwest before an interchange with Interstate 526 (I-526; Mark Clark Expressway). At an intersection with Magwood Drive, the highway takes on the Glenn McConnell Parkway name. It passes southwest of West Ashley Park and northeast of West Ashley High School. The highway crosses over some railroad tracks just before it meets its northern terminus, an intersection with Bees Ferry Road.

Major intersections

See also

References

External links

SC 461 South Carolina Hwy Index

461
Transportation in Charleston, South Carolina